11'09"1 September 11 is a 2002 international film composed of 11 contributions from different filmmakers, each from a different country. Each gave their own vision of the events in New York City during the September 11 attacks, in a short film of 11 minutes, 9 seconds, and one frame. The original concept and production of the film was by French producer Alain Brigand. It has been released internationally with several different titles, depending on the language. It is listed in the Internet Movie Database as 11'09"01 - September 11, while in French, it is known as 11 minutes 9 secondes 1 image and in Persian as 11-e-Septambr.

Plot
Eleven episodes of eleven different directors on the tragedy of September 11, 2001, each lasting 11 minutes, 9 seconds, and 1 frame: 11'09"01.

Episode # 01: " Iran"  
  'Direction' : Samira Makhmalbaf
The news of the September 11, 2001 attacks reaches an Afghan refugee camp, where bricks are produced to build new shelters, in view of the attacks promised by the United States. Here a young teacher tries to explain to her young students what happened and to make them respect a minute of silence in honor of the victims. Attempts, however, fail one after another. Finally, the teacher finds herself having to impose the minute of silence on the children near a chimney (the most similar to a skyscraper).

Episode # 02: " France"  
  'Direction' : Claude Lelouch
New York, September 11, 2001: a young French photographer deaf-mute is a guest of her fiancé, a tourist guide for disabled people who is about to bring a group to visit the Twin Towers. After she tried to explain to him that a story "at a distance" like theirs has no chance of succeeding, he tries to leave a message to the computer before leaving explaining that only a miracle can keep them together. At that moment he returns home covered in dust, miraculously escaping the attack.

Episode # 03: " Egypt"  
  Director : Youssef Chahine
New York, September 10, 2001: director Yusuf Shahin is finalizing the filming of a film at the World Trade Center, but is sent away with his crew in a decisive manner by a policeman because he has no authorization to stay there. Two days later, Shahin presented himself at a press conference, but said he was upset by the attacks and asked to be able to postpone it, triggering the reaction of a journalist.

While he is on the cliff in front of the house, the ghost of a young American soldier appears to him, who died in the attack on multinational forces in Lebanon in 1983. The soldier reveals to Shahin that he is the only one who can see him, because he is the only one who can hear and understand what is going on around. The two face a "journey" that leads them to analyze the roots of the clash between the United States and the Arab world, starting from the house of the young Arab who was the executor material of the attack. After observing his preparation, Shahin discusses with his parents, who say they are proud of what he has done and go on to complain of the constant violence suffered by the Palestinians by Israel.

The soldier reacts by saying that, although he understands the attacks against the soldiers, it is still not right to shoot in the pile. The director counters by showing the list of victims of US military interventions and wars after the Second World War, not justifying the violence but complaining about the United States' inability to understand that the legitimate defense of their principles often goes through the destruction of other countries. Their path ends at Arlington National Cemetery, where Shahin finds his girlfriend and the young soldier's father, who turns out to be the policeman who drove him away from the Twin Towers and with whom he reconciles. Shortly thereafter, the phantom of the attacker appears, who resolutely reproaches the director for appearing too good with that soldier. Shahin replies that both are victims of human stupidity, but the attacker responds by reiterating his position once again and showing he does not want to understand, leaving the director stunned by his uncompromising words.

Episode # 04: " Bosnia-Herzegovina"  
  Director : Danis Tanović
Despite the attacks in New York, a girl from Srebrenica considers it appropriate to celebrate the monthly demonstration anyway, in memory of the massacre of the local population by Bosnian Serb soldiers, which took place on July 11, 1995.

Episode # 05: " Burkina Faso"  
  'Direction' : Idrissa Ouédraogo
Ouagadougou, September 2001: Adamà is a boy who is forced to leave school and work as a newsboy in order to be able to pay for medicines to his sick mother. Two weeks after the attacks, Adamà sees a man very similar to Osama bin Laden and decides to capture him with the help of his friends, in order to claim the size of 25 million pending on his boss. The boys decide to use that money to treat Adamà's mother and, potentially, many other sick people in the country, as well as not to say anything to the adults, to prevent them from wasting the money of the size.

The boys steal the camera of one of their parents and start to follow "Osama bin Laden" to a clearing where, every day, he goes to pray. The five therefore devise a plan to capture him in that clearing, but "bin Laden" does not show up that day. The boys try to capture him at the hotel, but they discover that the man is now going to the airport, where they are stopped by the policeman before they could enter. In the end, the boys decide to sell the camera and give Adamà the money, so he can look after his mother and go back to school.

Episode # 06: " United Kingdom"  
  'Direction' : Ken Loach
Pablo, a Chilean refugee in London, writes a letter to the families of the victims of the September 11 attacks, reminding them of "his" September 11: Chilean coup of 1973, when the general Augusto Pinochet implemented a coup d'état (backed by the US) against left-wing president Salvador Allende, democratically elected in 1970. Pablo narrates in his letter of US involvement in financing of right-wing and subversive groups, up to the coup, and of the violence and torture suffered by him and his countrymen. Forced to first five years in prison and then into exile, he declares that he can no longer return to Chile because his family and children are now born and raised in the United Kingdom. Pablo concludes his letter with the hope that, as he will unite in the memory of the victims of September 11, 2001, so they will join him in memory of the victims of September 11, 1973.

Episode # 07: " Mexico"  
  'Direction' : Alejandro González Iñárritu
Black screen. Background noises and rumors of everyday life, suddenly interrupted by the screams of the witnesses of the crash of flight AA11 against the North Tower of the World Trade Center. While the black screen is occasionally interrupted by the repertoire images of the attacks, the voices of the announcements on television, the screams of the victims, the explosions of the planes, the calls made by the victims and their relatives overlap. The sound stops and you can see the two towers collapse without sound. The background voices start again on a background of violins, while the screen gradually changes from black to white. Two writings appear (one in Arabic characters and one in Latin characters) of the same meaning: "Does God's light guide us or blind us?" The sentences finally disappear in a blinding light.

Episode # 08: " Israel"  
  'Direction' : Amos Gitai
A suicide attack shakes Tel Aviv. Soldiers, policemen and doctors for various, long minutes try to coordinate the operations of security and rescue. A journalist and her crew arrive at the scene and try in every way to obtain information from the police forces present, obtaining only peremptory invitations to clear the area. At one point, the director tells the journalist that she won't go on the air and she reacts first by protesting, then starting to rattle off various historical events that took place all on September 11. While the journalist insists on carrying out her service, the voice of the director is heard in the background telling her that something very serious happened in New York, to the point of explicitly saying "remember this date, September 11th, because it is a date that nobody more will forget ". Faced with the further (but now unintelligible) protests of the journalist, the director replies "I'm not talking to you about September 11th of '44 or '97, I'm talking about September 11th today".

Episode # 09: " Pakistan"  
  'Direction' : Mira Nair
A Pakistani woman has not heard from her son Salman since the day of the attacks on the Twin Towers. CIA and FBI repeatedly question her, since they believe the young man, of Muslim faith, could be linked to the attacks. In particular, they ask many questions about why he did not show up for work that day and why, despite having decided to pursue a medical career and leave the police academy, he still held the latter's card.

While the woman does not resign herself to the disappearance of her son, the media begin to report the news of her involvement in the attack, which does nothing but exacerbate the isolation in which the woman and the family have fallen. Only after six months, the boy's remains are identified among those found among the rubble and the truth is re-established: it turns out that the young man died while he was helping at the site of the attacks. During the funeral, the mother denounces the climate of suspicion that has been created against her family and against the Muslim community in the United States.

Episode # 10: " United States of America"  
  'Direction' : Sean Penn

An old man spends his life alone in an apartment overshadowed by the Twin Towers. The widowed man vents his loneliness by talking to his late wife as if she were still alive and cultivating her flower pot, withered by the lack of light. The collapse of the Towers finally allows the light to flood the apartment and suddenly revitalizes the flowers. The elder, happy for what happened, tries to show the vase to his wife, but the light "reveals" the illusion in which he lived until then. Between tears, he regrets that his wife is not there to finally see the vase bloom again.

Episode # 11: " Japan"  
  'Direction' : Shōhei Imamura
Japan, August 1945. Yoichi, a soldier returned from the front with post-traumatic disorder, behaves like a snake, to the dismay of his parents and his wife. His family tries to convince him to return to the "human" state, but without success. The other villagers begin to look at them with suspicion and fear, but this does not prevent Yoichi's wife from having an extra-marital relationship.

While the wife and her lover talk about the traumatic experiences that the soldier must have suffered, of the new type of bomb used in the bombing of Hiroshima and the forthcoming end of the war, the situation worsens: Yoichi swallows a mouse under the horrified eyes of his mother, who decides to chase him away. In the following days, the villagers suffer the loss of various animals and everyone blames the mad soldier. It is thus decided to organize a search operation to find it, but without success. Meanwhile, a flashback clarifies the reason for the soldier's behavior: hiding behind a boulder after a violent battle, Yoichi is beaten by a fellow soldier who asks him why he does not take part in this "holy war".

During the hunt, Yoichi's wife accidentally finds her husband drinking water from a river and asks him "do you dislike being a man so much?" Yoichi, in response, crawls away ignoring his wife. Finally, a snake is shown above a river stone, while the inscription in Japanese "Holy wars do not exist" appears.

Awards
At the 2002 Venice Film Festival, the film received the UNESCO Award and Ken Loach's segment was the winner of the FIPRESCI Prize for Best Short Film.

Producers
 Alain Brigand (artistic producer)
 Jacques Perrin
 Nicolas Mauvernay
 Tania Zazulinsky (segment "France")
 Gabriel Khoury (segment "Egypt")
 Marianne Khoury (segment "Egypt")
 Čedomir Kolar (segment "Bosnia-Herzegovina")
 Nicolas Cand (segment "Burkina Faso")
 Rebecca O'Brien (segment "United Kingdom")
 Alejandro González Iñárritu (segment "Mexico")
 Gustavo Santaolalla (segment "Mexico")
 Laurent Truchot (segment "Israel")
 Lydia Dean Pilcher (segment "India")
 Jon C. Scheide (segment "United States of America")
 Catherine Dussart (segment "Japan")
 Nobuyuki Kajikawa (segment "Japan")
 Masamichi Sawada (segment "Japan")
 Masato Shinada (segment "Japan")

Writers
 Youssef Chahine (segment "Egypt")
 Sabrina Dhawan (segment "India")
 Amos Gitaï (segment "Israel")
 Alejandro González Iñárritu (segment "Mexico")
 Paul Laverty (segment "United Kingdom")
 Claude Lelouch (segment "France")
 Ken Loach (segment "United Kingdom")
 Samira Makhmalbaf (segment "Iran")
 Idrissa Ouedraogo (segment "Burkina Faso")
 Sean Penn (segment "United States of America")
 Marie José Sanselme (segment "Israel")
 Danis Tanović (segment "Bosnia-Herzegovina")
 Daisuke Tengan (segment "Japan")
 Pierre Uytterhoeven (segment "France")
 Vladimir Vega (segment "United Kingdom")

Music
 Michael Brook (segment "United States of America")
 Mohammad-Reza Darvishi (segment "Iran")
 Alexandre Desplat (title music)
 Manu Dibango (segment "Burkina Faso")
 Osvaldo Golijov (segment "Mexico")
 Tarō Iwashiro (segment "Japan")
 Salif Keita (segment "Burkina Faso")
 Heitor Pereira (segment "United States of America")
 Gustavo Santaolalla (segment "Mexico")
 Vladimir Vega (segment "United Kingdom")

Cinematography
 Samuel Bayer (segment "United States of America")
 Luc Drion (segment "Burkina Faso")
 Ebrahim Ghafori (segment "Iran")
 Pierre-William Glenn (segment "France")
 Peter Hellmich (segment "United Kingdom")
 Yoav Kosh (segment "Israel")
 Mustafa Mustafić (segment "Bosnia-Herzegovina")
 Mohsen Nasr (segment "Egypt")
 Masakazu Oka (segment "Japan")
 Declan Quinn (segment "India")
 Toshihiro Seino (segment "Japan")
 Jorge Müller Silva (segment "United Kingdom")
 Nigel Willoughby (segment "United Kingdom")

Editing
 Rashida Abdel Salam (segment "Egypt")
 Kim Bica (segment "Mexico")
 Jay Cassidy (segment "United States of America")
 Robert Duffy (segment "Mexico")
 Alejandro González Iñárritu (segment "Mexico")
 Julia Gregory (segment "Burkina-Faso")
 Allyson C. Johnson (segment "India")
 Mohsen Makhmalbaf (segment "Iran")
 Stéphane Mazalaigue (segment "France")
 Jonathan Morris (segment "United Kingdom")
 Kobi Netanel (segment "Israel")
 Hajime Okayasu (segment "Japan")
 Monique Rysselinck (segment "Bosnia-Herzegovina")

References

External links

11'09"01 September 11 at Allmovie

2002 films
Anthology films
2000s Arabic-language films
2000s English-language films
English-language Egyptian films
English-language French films
English-language Iranian films
English-language Japanese films
English-language Mexican films
2000s French-language films
French Sign Language films
2000s Hebrew-language films
Persian-language films
2000s Spanish-language films
Films scored by Michael Brook
Films scored by Alexandre Desplat
Films scored by Heitor Pereira
Films scored by Gustavo Santaolalla
Films scored by Taro Iwashiro
Films based on the September 11 attacks
Films directed by Youssef Chahine
Films directed by Amos Gitai
Films directed by Alejandro González Iñárritu
Films directed by Shohei Imamura
Films directed by Claude Lelouch
Films directed by Ken Loach
Films directed by Samira Makhmalbaf
Films directed by Mira Nair
Films directed by Idrissa Ouedraogo
Films directed by Sean Penn
Films directed by Danis Tanović
Films with screenplays by Alejandro González Iñárritu
Films with screenplays by Sabrina Dhawan
Films about the atomic bombings of Hiroshima and Nagasaki
Films about post-traumatic stress disorder
Films set in Bosnia and Herzegovina
Films set in London
Films set in Virginia
Films set in 1945
Films about refugees
Films set in Manhattan
Films set in Iran
Israeli–Palestinian conflict films
Films about veterans
Japanese World War II films
Films set in Tel Aviv
Films set in Burkina Faso
Films set in Japan
Films set in Pakistan
Bosnian War films
Films about coups d'état
Films about photographers
Films about film directors and producers
2000s Japanese films